The schooner Separación Dominicana was the first armed Dominican naval vessel of the Dominican War of Independence and is claimed to be the founding vessel of the Dominican Navy. She was captained by Commander Juan Bautista Cambiaso.

See also
 Battle of Tortuguero
 Dominican Navy

Schooners of the Dominican Navy
1844 ships